Arkansas Highway 367 (AR 367 or Hwy. 367) is a designation for two north–south state highways in Arkansas. A southern route of  travels north from U.S. Route 167 (US 167) in East End north to US 70 in Little Rock. A northern route of  begins in Cabot at US 67/AR 5/AR 321 and travels northeast to US 412 in Walnut Ridge.

Route description

East End to Little Rock
The southern segment begins in Little Rock, Arkansas at an intersection with US 70 (Roosevelt Road) as part of Arch Street. Its southern terminus is at an intersection with US 167 south of East End, Arkansas. Traveling generally north to south, it is a former alignment of US 167. It is commonly known as "Arch Street" or "Arch Street Pike" after the Little Rock street.

Cabot to Walnut Ridge
The northern segment begins at an intersection with US 412 and AR 34 at Walnut Ridge; its southern terminus is in Cabot, Arkansas at an intersection with US 67, AR 5, and AR 321. Traveling mostly northeast to southwest, it is a former alignment of US 67.

Major intersections

Beebe spur

The northern terminus is at an intersection with US 67 / US 167/ US 64 (Future I-57) north of Beebe. Arkansas. Its southern terminus is in Beebe at an intersection with AR 367. It continues south as N. Pecan St.

See also

References

External links

367
Transportation in Independence County, Arkansas
Transportation in Jackson County, Arkansas
Transportation in Lonoke County, Arkansas
Transportation in Pulaski County, Arkansas
Transportation in Saline County, Arkansas
Transportation in White County, Arkansas
U.S. Route 67